The 2021-22 season will be Reggina 1914's 107th season in existence.  It will be their second consecutive season in Serie B.  They will also participate in this season's Coppa Italia.

First-team squad

As of 16 July 2021

Transfers and loans

Transfers in

Loans in

Transfers out

Loans out

Pre-season and friendlies

Reggina began preparations for the new season on July 10 with medical testing at Centro sportivo Sant'Agata in Reggio Calabria. A squad of 23 players began training in Sarnano on July 14.

Results list Reggina's goal tally first.

Competitions

Overview

Serie B

League table

Results summary

Results by round

Matches

Coppa Italia

Results list Reggina's goal tally first.

Squad statistics

Appearances

|-
! colspan=14 style=background:#DCDCDC; text-align:center| Goalkeepers

|-
! colspan=14 style=background:#DCDCDC; text-align:center| Defenders

|-
! colspan=14 style=background:#DCDCDC; text-align:center| Midfielders

|-
! colspan=14 style=background:#DCDCDC; text-align:center| Forwards

Last updated: 29 August 2021

Goalscorers

Disciplinary record

References

External links

Reggina 1914 seasons
Reggina 1914